Delvic Dyvon "Dino" Philyaw (born October 30, 1970) is a retired American professional football player who served as a running back and kick returner for  the National Football League's Carolina Panthers and New Orleans Saints.

Originally drafted in 1995 by the New England Patriots, he signed with the team shortly after he was drafted, but was cut by the team on September 1, 1995. He later joined the expansion Carolina Panthers for one game during the 1995 season, returning one kickoff for 23 yards. The following season, he returned to the Panthers as a backup running back to Anthony Johnson. With the Panthers in 1996, Philyaw rushed for 38 yards and scored his only touchdown. After being released by the Panthers after the 1996 season, Philyaw was out of the NFL for both the 1997 and 1998 seasons, briefly playing with NFL Europe's Scottish Claymores in 1998. He returned to the NFL in 1999 serving as the New Orleans Saints primary kick returner and a backup running back. He returned 53 kickoffs for 1,165 yards and rushed for an additional 16 yards. He joined the short-lived XFL in 2000 as a member of the New York/New Jersey Hitmen before leaving pro football for good.

References
 http://www.nfl.com/players/profile?id=PHI777180

External links
Just Sports Stats

1970 births
Living people
African-American players of American football
American football running backs
Carolina Panthers players
New Orleans Saints players
New York/New Jersey Hitmen players
Oregon Ducks football players
Scottish Claymores players
21st-century African-American sportspeople
20th-century African-American sportspeople